Cross-phase modulation (XPM) is a nonlinear optical effect where one wavelength of light can affect the phase of another wavelength of light through the optical Kerr effect. When the optical power from a wavelength impacts the refractive index, the impact of the new refractive index on another wavelength is known as XPM.

Applications of XPM 

Cross-phase modulation can be used as a technique for adding information to a light stream by modifying the phase of a coherent optical beam with another beam through interactions in an appropriate nonlinear medium.  This technique is applied to fiber optic communications. If both beams have the same wavelength, then this type of cross-phase modulation is degenerate.

XPM is among the most commonly used techniques for quantum nondemolition measurements.

Other advantageous applications of XPM include:
Nonlinear optical Pulse Compression of ultrashort pulses
Passive mode-locking
Ultrafast optical switching
Demultiplexing of OTDM channels
Wavelength conversion of WDM channels
Measurement of nonlinear optical properties of the media (non-linear index n2 (Kerr nonlinearity) and nonlinear response relaxation time)

Disadvantages of XPM

XPM in DWDM applications 
In dense wavelength-division multiplexing (DWDM) applications with intensity modulation and direct detection (IM-DD), the effect of XPM is a two step process:
First the signal is phase modulated by the copropagating second signal. In a second step dispersion leads to a transformation of the phase modulation into a power variation. Additionally, the dispersion results in a walk-off between the channels and thereby reduces the effect of XPM.
XPM leads to interchannel crosstalk in WDM systems
It can produce amplitude and timing jitter

See also 
 Self-phase modulation — SPM
 Four wave mixing — FWM
 Stimulated Raman scattering — SRS
 Cross-polarized wave generation — XPW

References

External links
 Cross-phase modulation (RP Photonics, Encyclopedia of Laser Physics and Technology)

Nonlinear optics
Fiber optics